John Cheverell (before 1381-after 1439), of Chilfrome, Chantmarle and Upper Sturthill, Dorset, was an English politician and lawyer.

His wife was Joan Chantmarle, daughter and coheiress of John Chantmarle of East Stoke and Chantmarle. They had one son, the MP, Walter Cheverell.

He was a Member (MP) of the Parliament of England for Wareham in 1406 and for Dorchester in 1407.

References

14th-century births
15th-century deaths
English MPs 1406
Politicians from Dorset
English MPs 1407
Members of the Parliament of England for Dorchester